The Spanish March or Hispanic March (Aragonese and ,), was a military buffer zone beyond the former province of Septimania, established by Charlemagne in 795 as a defensive barrier between the Umayyad Moors of Al-Andalus and the Frankish Carolingian Empire (Duchy of Gascony, the Duchy of Aquitaine and Carolingian Septimania).

In its broader meaning, Spanish March sometimes refers to a group of early Iberian and trans-Pyrenean lordships or counts coming under Frankish rule. As time passed, these lordships merged or gained independence from Frankish imperial rule.

Geographical context
The area broadly corresponds to the eastern regions between the Pyrenees and the Ebro River. The local population of the March was diverse. It included Basques in its north-western valleys, Jews, and a large Occitano-Romance-speaking Hispano-Roman population (Occitans and Catalans) governed by the Visigothic Code, all of them under the influence of Al-Andalus culture, since their lords had vowed allegiance to Cordoban rulers until Pepin's conquest of Andalusian Septimania (759). The Pyrenean valleys started to switch loyalties after 785 (Girona, Ribagorza, etc.) with the construction and garrisoning by counts loyal to the Carolingians of new outposts and fortresses on bordering areas.

The territory changed with the fortunes of the Empires and the feudal ambitions of those, whether counts or walis, appointed to administer the counties. Eventually, the rulers and people of the March became autonomous and claimed independence. Out of the welter of counties in the region emerged the Principality of Catalonia composed by a myriad of counties with the County of Barcelona as their main power centre.

Counties that at various times formed part of the March included: Ribagorza (initially including Pallars), Urgell, Cerdanya, Perelada, Empúries, Besalú, Ausona (Osona), Barcelona, Girona (March of Hispania) and, Conflent, Roussillon, Vallespir and Fenollet (March of Gothia). The nominal boundaries of Gothia and the Spanish March vary in time, not without confusion. While Navarre and Aragon have sometimes been depicted within the Spanish March, they were not part of it, but they came under the Carolingian area of influence between 794 and 806 within the Basque (also rendered as "Gascon") marches, or Duchy of Vasconia.

Origins

The Spanish March resulted from the expansion south of the Frankish realm from their heartland in Neustria and Austrasia starting with Charles Martel in 732 and after various decades fighting between the Franks and Umayyads (Saraceni) in the Iberian Peninsula.

The Muslim invasion reached the Pyrenees in the Iberian Peninsula. In 719 the forces of Al-Samh ibn Malik surged up the east coast, overwhelming the remaining Visigoth province of Septimania and establishing a fortified base at Narbonne. Control was secured by offering the local population generous terms, inter-marriage between ruling families or treaties. Further Umayyad expansion was halted on Al-Samh ibn Malik al-Khawlanis defeat at the Battle of Toulouse. Wālis were installed in Girona and Barcelona.

The Muslim forces however continued to raid their Gallic neighbours to the north, reaching as far as Autun. Peace was signed in 730 between the victor at Toulouse, the Duke of Aquitaine, and 'Uthman ibn Naissa (Munuza), a Berber rebel lord stationed in Cerdanya (maybe current-day Catalonia), a region that could act as a buffer state against Umayyad expansionism. The peace treaty was sealed with the marriage of the Duke’s daughter to Munuza. However, Munuza was defeated by a Umayyad military expedition (731) and another period of Muslim expansion commenced.

Aquitaine (including the Duchy of Vasconia) pledged formal allegiance to the Frankish leaders several times (Odo in 732, Hunald in 736 after being defeated), but remained actually independent. In 737 Charles led an expedition to the Lower Rhone and Septimania, possibly seeing that the Umayyad thrust was threatening his grip on Burgundy (subdued in 736), but did not manage to subjugate and keep the region.

Both Aquitaine and Septimania were still out of central Frankish control after Charles's death, but Pepin the Short was determined to subdue southern Gaul. In 759, after conquering Septimania from the Umayyad, the Carolingian king focused all his might in crushing Aquitanian resistance to central Frankish power. After a ruthless war of 8 years, Aquitainian independence came to an end. Toulouse was now under the grip of the new Carolingian king Charlemagne and access to Andalusian Hispania was open for him, despite sporadic rebellions in Vasconia during the next two decades (Basques subdued in 790 by Charlemagne's new loyal strongman in Toulouse William of Gellone).

Pepin's son, Charlemagne, fulfilled the Carolingian goal of extending the defensive boundaries of the empire beyond Septimania, creating a strong barrier state between the Umayyad Emirate/Caliphate of Iberia and the Frankish Empire, besides tightening control over the Duchy of Vasconia by establishing the Kingdom of Aquitaine ruled by his son Louis the Pious in 781.

Creation
The Franks created the Spanish March by conquering former north-eastern territory of the Visigothic kingdom of Hispania, which had been conquered by the Muslims.

The first county to be conquered was Roussillon (with Vallespir) in around 760. In 785 the county of Girona (with Besalú) to the south of the Pyrenees was taken. Ribagorza and Pallars were linked to Toulouse and were added to this county around 790. Urgell and Cerdanya were added in 798. The first records of the county of Empúries (with Perelada) are from 812 but the county was probably under Frankish control before 800.

After a series of struggles the County of Barcelona (with Ausona) was taken by Frankish forces in 801. A number of castles were established in Aragon between 798 and 802 (appointment of Count Aureolus). After subduing the Basques to the north of the Pyrenees (790), Frankish overlordship expanded to the upper Ebro (794) and Pamplona (798), when Alfonso II of Asturias also came under Charlemagne's influence. Sobrarbe was not incorporated into the March, as it appears later in history and was probably within the area of influence of the County of Aragon.

The death of Charlemagne (814) was followed by a scene of open revolt and Carolingian setbacks around the Pyrenees. After being defeated by the Moors in the 816 Battle of Pancorbo, Pamplona, now led by the native Basque lord Iñigo Arista, broke away from the Spanish March, with the County of Aragon following suit shortly thereafter in 820. The named Catalan counties - territories used by the Moors to enter and overrun Septimania in 719 - became, at this point, a natural extension of the March of Gothia ruled by Catalans and Toulousains under the Carolingian Empire.

Structure

The local population of the March was diverse. The majority were Basques and Hispano-Romans (Goths). But there were also Muslims, and Jews from Septimania who repopulated the Frankish conquered easternmost territories of present-day North Spain and a small portion of South France. The area changed with the fortunes of the empires and the feudal ambitions of the counts appointed to administrate the counties. As Frankish imperial power waned, the rulers of the March of Hispania became independent fiefs. The region would later become part of Catalonia.

Charlemagne's son Louis took Barcelona from its Moorish ruler in 801, thus securing Frankish power in the borderland between the Franks and the Moors. The Counts of Barcelona then became the principal representatives of Frankish authority in the Spanish March. The March included various outlying smaller territories, each ruled by a lesser miles with his armed retainers and who theoretically owed allegiance through the Count to the Emperor.

The rulers were called counts; when they governed several counties they often took the name duke (Dux Gothiae). When the county formed the border with the Muslim Kingdom, the Frankish title marquis (Marquis de Gothie) was chosen. Besides, certain counts aspired to the Frankish title "Prince of Gothia". A margrave or Marcgravi is a Graf ("duke") of the March. The first Toulousains and Catalan lords who held the title of Counts of Barcelona, Bernard of Septimania, Humfrid, Bernard of Gothia, Borrell II and Ramon Borrell carried these titles.

In the early 9th century, Charlemagne began issuing a new kind of land grant, the aprisio, which reallocated land previously held by the imperial crown fisc in deserted or abandoned areas. This included special rights and immunities that allowed considerable independence from the imperial control. Historians have interpreted the aprisio both as an early form of feudalism and in economic and military terms as a mechanism to entice settlers to a depopulated border region. Such self-sufficient landholders would aid the Counts in providing armed men to defend the Frankish frontier. Aprisio grants (the first ones were in Septimania) were given personally by the Carolingian king, so that they reinforced loyalty to central power, to counterbalance the local power exercised by the Marcher Counts.

However poor communications and a distant central power allowed basic feudal entities to develop often self-sufficient and heavily agrarian. Each was ruled by a small hereditary military elite. These developments in the territories that later would become Catalonia followed similar patterns in other borderlands and March. For example, the first Count of Barcelona Bera was appointed by the King in 801, however subsequently strong heirs of Counts were able to inherit the title such as Sunifred, fl. 844–848. This gradually became custom until Countship became hereditary (for Wifred the Hairy in 897). The County became de facto independent under count Borrell II, when he ceased to request royal charters after the kings Lothair and Hugh Capet failed to assist him in the defense of the County against Muslim leader al-Mansur, although the change of dynasty may have played a part in that decision.

The early history of Andorra in the Pyrenees provides a fairly typical example of a lordship of the region, as Andorra is the only part of the Spanish March that was never incorporated into either France or Spain, a feat mentioned in its national anthem, El Gran Carlemany.

References

Further reading

External links
Ian Meadows, "The Arabs in Occitania"
Archibald R. Lewis, "The Development of Southern French and Catalan Society, 718–1050"

Carolingian marches
Medieval Catalonia
States and territories established in the 790s
795 establishments